Juozas Ambrazevičius or Juozas Brazaitis (December 9, 1903 in Trakiškiai, Marijampolė parish – November 28, 1974 in South Orange, New Jersey), was a Lithuanian literary historian, better known for his political career and nationalistic views. He was the acting Prime Minister of the Provisional Government of Lithuania from June 23, 1941 to August 5, 1941.

Academic career

Ambrazevičius studied literature at the University of Lithuania in Kaunas and the University of Bonn. From 1927 he lectured on Lithuanian literature and folklore in Kaunas. By the end of the 1930s he got involved in numerous organizations for literature teachers and scientists. His major works include Theory of Literature (Literatūros teorija in 1930), two-volume A History of World Literature (Visoutinė literatūros istorija in 1931-1932), Vaižgantas (in 1936), three-volume New Readings (Naujieji skaitymai), Lithuanian Writers (Lietuvių rašytojai in 1938). He also worked on the editorial staff of national daily Lietuva (Lithuania) and Catholic daily XX amžius (The 20th Century). He would sometimes use pseudonym Servus to write for these newspapers. During World War II he edited an underground periodical Į laisvę (Towards Freedom) which he later revived in Germany and in the United States.

Biography after the 1941 uprising in Lithuania
It is known that in the summer of 1944 Ambrazevičius left for Germany, and in 1948 for the United States, where he edited a Catholic daily, Darbininkas, and continued his work in the Supreme Committee for the Liberation of Lithuania in exile. He published a number of leaflets illustrating German and Soviet crimes in Lithuania and the Lithuanian resistance, for example, In the Name of the Lithuanian People (1946) and Appeal to the United Nations on Genocide (1951). In 1964 he published a book Alone, all alone about the Lithuanian armed resistance. The Kremlin actively opposed his activities. In the 1970s he became a subject of interest for the Soviet media and American hunters of Nazi collaborators, who accused him of having worked for the Third Reich. In reply, he published an extensive dossier of his World War II activities.

Grave
In 2012, Ambrazevičius' remains were transported from the United States to Lithuania and were reburied in the churchyard of Christ's Resurrection Church in Kaunas. During the reburial ceremony of the Juozas Ambrazevičius remains in Kaunas, adviser to Lithuanian Prime Minister Andrius Kubilius claimed that a 1975 investigation by US Immigration found no evidence of Brazaitis being involved in anti-Semitic or pro-Nazi activities. However, according to a subsequent clarification issued in 2019 by the Foreign Affairs Committee of the US Congress, the investigation was not conclusive and did not amount to a "rehabilitation" of Ambrazevičius/Brazaitis. The investigation into his wartime activities was discontinued after Ambrazevičius/Brazaitis passed away in 1974.

References

External links
  Juozas Ambrazevičius-Brazaitis (1903–1974) in Voruta.

1903 births
1974 deaths
20th-century Lithuanian historians
Lithuanian Activist Front members
Lithuanian folklorists
Lithuanian independence activists
Lithuanian literary historians
Lithuanian people of World War II
Prime Ministers of Lithuania
University of Bonn alumni
Vytautas Magnus University alumni

Lithuanian collaborators with Nazi Germany